Henry Leslie Williams (26 December 1919 – 2013) was Archdeacon of Chester from 1975 to 1988.

Williams was educated at St David's College, Lampeter and  ordained  in 1944 following a period of study at St. Michael's College, Llandaff. After curacies in Aberdyfi,  Bangor and Chester he was Vicar of Barnston from 1953 to 1984. He was also a Chaplain in the Territorial Army from 1953 to 1962; Rural Dean  of Wirral North from 1967 to 1975; an Honorary Canon of Chester Cathedral from 1972 to 1975; and a  Member of the General Synod from 1978 to 1988.

Notes

1919 births
Alumni of the University of Wales, Lampeter
Alumni of St Michael's College, Llandaff
Archdeacons of Chester
2013 deaths
Place of death missing